The Australian National Korean War Memorial is on Anzac Parade, the principal ceremonial and memorial avenue in Canberra, the national capital city of Australia.

The Korean War began on 25 June 1950 when the forces of North Korea invaded South Korea. 17,000 Australians fought under the command of the United Nations until the armistice in 1953. This memorial commemorates and honours those who died and served.

Sculpture

The design of the memorial characterises the period of the Korean War. The use of white and grey tones, and granite and gravel, recall the harsh climate and terrain that were lasting impressions for those who fought there.

On both sides of the memorial are figures representing Australian soldiers, sailors and airmen who served in Korea. Battlefield boulders are set in fields of stainless steel poles which symbolise those who died.

A central walk-way leads to a semi-enclosed contemplative space. A boulder from a Korean battlefield is a focal commemorative point with the words "Peace and Independence" inscribed in Korean. Inside are images, maps and text etched into stainless steel panels telling the story of the Australians who served in the Korean War, on the left telling the general story and on the right telling of particular involvement of the Navy (nine ships and an air group), Army (3 RAR, and elements of 1 & 2 RAR), and Air Force (77 Squadron and other elements).

A scroll recognises the 21 nations that committed troops or medical units to the UN command.

The obelisk at the front commemorates those who died with no known graves. The inscription, taken from the UN Memorial Cemetery, Busan, is a poignant link with the Australians who are buried there.

Dedications
A ground-breaking ceremony was conducted on 17 September 1999 by Kim Dae-jung, President of the Republic of Korea and John Howard MP, Prime Minister of Australia, which is commemorated by a foundation stone.
 
The memorial was dedicated in the presence of Sir William Deane AC K.B.E., Governor-General of Australia and John Howard MP, Prime Minister of Australia.

Gallery

See also 

 Queensland Korean War Memorial
 Military Memorials of National Significance in Australia

References

External links

Korean War Memorial in AustralianPlanet

Australian military memorials
Korean War memorials and cemeteries
Military memorials in Canberra